Jyrki Valto Yrttiaho (4 May 1952 – 17 February 2021) was a Finnish politician and member of the Finnish Parliament, representing the Left Alliance. He was born in Pelkosenniemi. He was elected to the Finnish Parliament in the 2007 election.

References

External links
Parliament of Finland: Jyrki Yrttiaho
Left Alliance: Jyrki Yrttiaho 

1952 births
2021 deaths
People from Pelkosenniemi
Left Alliance (Finland) politicians
Members of the Parliament of Finland (2007–11)
Members of the Parliament of Finland (2011–15)
Place of death missing